Thomas Little (22 June 1872–unknown) was a Scottish footballer who played in the Football League for Barnsley, Derby County, Luton Town and Manchester City.

References

1872 births
Date of death unknown
Scottish footballers
English Football League players
Association football forwards
Nithsdale Wanderers F.C. players
Derby County F.C. players
Manchester City F.C. players
Ashton North End F.C. players
Luton Town F.C. players
Swindon Town F.C. players
Barnsley F.C. players